Cyberpunk Fiction: A Synthcore "Soundtrack" is a various artists compilation album released on November 17, 1998 by Re-Constriction Records.

Reception
Aiding & Abetting gave it mixed review, praising the execution while saying "the spoken parts sound a little hokey" and the "music sounds like rote walkthroughs." Sonic Boom called the album a parody masterpiece and "not only are most of the cover interpretations by Synthcore and Electro bands dazzling but the re-written dialogue is the funniest thing I have heard in years." Chris Best of Lollipop Magazine praised the "concoction of heavy beats and eerily juxtaposed melodies", saying "the fit is strange and awkward, but the accidental result is that each group transforms their sound from typical dance floor industrial into a totally new beast."

Track listing

Accolades

Personnel
Adapted from the CyberPunk Fiction - A Synthcore "Soundtrack" liner notes.

Production and design
 Chase – compiling
 Scott Gorham – mastering
 Kevin Marburg – cover art
 Josquin des Pres – mastering

Additional musicians
 Kait Ellen Cottengim – voice (1)
 Kyle Cottengim – voice (1)
 Dave Creadeau – voice (2, 8, 15)
 DJ Twitch – voice (7)
 Kari Beth Hodson – voice (8)
 Satan Ferrell – voice (13)
 Roman Greene – voice (2, 15, 17)
 John "Ur-Grue" Holder – voice (13)

Release history

References

External links 
 

1996 compilation albums
Alternative rock compilation albums
Industrial rock compilation albums
Re-Constriction Records compilation albums